Araneus arizonensis is a species of spider in the family Araneidae, found in United States and Mexico.

Taxonomy
The species was first described by Nathan Banks in 1900, as Epeira arizonensis. It was transferred to the genus Araneus by Alexander Petrunkevitch in 1911.

References

Araneidae
Spiders of Mexico
Spiders of the United States
Spiders described in 1900
Taxa named by Nathan Banks